Nat Holman (October 19, 1896 – February 12, 1995) was an American professional basketball player and college coach. He is a member of the Naismith Memorial Basketball Hall of Fame and is the only coach to lead his team to NCAA and National Invitation Tournament (NIT) championships in the same season.

Early life
Holman was born on the Lower East Side in New York City, to Russian immigrant parents, and was Jewish. He attended P.S. 62, and was then a star in basketball, soccer, and football at the High School of Commerce, graduated from the Savage School for Physical Education, and earned a master's degree from New York University. Known for his exceptional ball-handling and his accurate shooting, Holman was a star player for the NYU Violets men's basketball team.

Professional career

Holman was also an important player for the Original Celtics, which were no relation to the Boston Celtics. Also a gifted passer and excellent floor leader, Holman was a prototype of later playmakers.

Coaching career 
Although he played pro basketball until 1930, he took over the head coaching position at the City College of New York in 1920. Known as Mr. Basketball, Holman guided CCNY to the so-called grand slam of college basketball, winning both the NCAA and NIT titles in 1950, a feat that has never been achieved before or since (and is no longer possible as the tournaments are now done concurrently).

In 1951, Holman's CCNY team became involved in a national point shaving scandal that involved seven different schools.  While several CCNY players, including Ed Warner and Ed Roman were arrested, the investigation cleared Holman of any wrongdoing.  The scandal eventually led CCNY to de-emphasize athletics (CCNY eventually dropped down to the NCAA Division III in the 1963–64 season) and suspend Holman after the 1951–52 season. He returned for brief stints in 1954–56 and 1958–59, retiring for good in 1959. Holman compiled an overall record of 421–190 in 37 seasons at CCNY.

Holman also founded Camp Scatico in 1921 and ran the camp until he sold it to his niece and her husband in 1964.

In 1922, Holman wrote a book on basketball technique titled Scientific Basketball.

In his later years, he lived and died at the Hebrew Home for the Aged in the Riverdale section of the Bronx.

He was inducted into the Basketball Hall of Fame, the International Jewish Sports Hall of Fame, the New York Basketball Hall of Fame, and the CCNY Hall of Fame.

Head coaching record

See also
 List of select Jewish basketball players
 List of NCAA Division I Men's Final Four appearances by coach

References

External links
 

1896 births
1995 deaths
American men's basketball players
Basketball coaches from New York (state)
Basketball players from New York City
CCNY Beavers men's basketball coaches
International Jewish Sports Hall of Fame inductees
American people of Russian-Jewish descent
Jewish American sportspeople
Jewish men's basketball players
Naismith Memorial Basketball Hall of Fame inductees
New York Whirlwinds players
NYU Violets men's basketball players
Original Celtics players
20th-century American Jews